Art & Queer Culture is a survey of artwork about the culture of sexual identity from the last 125 years. It is written by Catherine Lord and Richard Meyer.

The book has three sections. The first of the two-part Survey Essay is by Richard Meyer called Inverted Histories: 1885–1979, the second of the two-part essay is by Catherine Lord called Inside the Body Politic: 1980–present. The Work section showcases over 220 key artworks. The Documents section is an archive of wide range of texts.

References

2013 non-fiction books
2010s LGBT literature
LGBT non-fiction books
LGBT African-American culture